Jair Alexander Reinoso Moreno (born 7 June 1985) is a Colombian football striker currently playing for Liga de Fútbol Profesional Boliviano club The Strongest.

Early years 
At 15 years of age he migrated to the United States, and although he had had a passion for football since childhood, it was there that he began to realize his goals and came to be recognized at an international level.

First division debut 
His debut in the first division came with Bolivian club Bolívar in the year 2008. Although he had been already a player for Tiro Federal in the Argentine first division, he didn't have the opportunity to make his debut in an official game.

Clubs 
Reserve team América de Cali (Colombia) 1993–1998
Villa Dalmine (Argentina) 2004
Reserve team River Plate (Argentina) 2004
Tiro Federal (Argentina) 2006
Nantes (France) -- 2006
Seleccion Miami (USA) 2007–2008
Club Bolívar (Bolivia) 2008–2009
Aurora (Bolivia) 2010–2012
Shenzhen Ruby (China) 2011
Once Caldas (Colombia) 2012
Cúcuta Deportivo (Colombia) 2013
The Strongest (Bolivia) 2013–2014
Cobreloa (Chile) 2014–2015
Harbin Yiteng (China) 2015-2016
Indy Eleven (USA) 2016
Club San José (Bolivia) 2017

Titles 
2009 Aerosur Cup - Club Bolívar
2009 Apertura - Club Bolívar
2013 Apertura - Club The Strongest

References

External links
 

1985 births
Living people
Colombian footballers
Colombian expatriate footballers
Tiro Federal footballers
Club Bolívar players
Club Aurora players
Shenzhen F.C. players
Cúcuta Deportivo footballers
Once Caldas footballers
Cobreloa footballers
Zhejiang Yiteng F.C. players
Chinese Super League players
China League One players
The Strongest players
Chilean Primera División players
Expatriate footballers in Argentina
Expatriate footballers in Bolivia
Expatriate footballers in Chile
Expatriate footballers in China
Colombian expatriate sportspeople in Chile
Colombian expatriate sportspeople in Bolivia
Colombian expatriate sportspeople in Argentina
Indy Eleven players
North American Soccer League players
Association football forwards
Footballers from Cali